Musicmagic is the seventh and final studio album of fusion band Return to Forever.

This album contains the final line-up of the band, with only founders Chick Corea and Stanley Clarke returning from the previous album.  This is the first album since Light as a Feather (1973) to contain vocals, featuring Stanley Clarke and Corea's wife Gayle Moran.  This album also marks the return of original member Joe Farrell on saxophone and flute, along with several new members making up a five-piece horn section.

In addition to the conventional two channel stereo version the album was also released by Columbia in a four channel quadraphonic version in 1977 as one of the last quadraphonic albums released by the label. In 2016 the album was re-issued in stereo on hybrid Super Audio CD by Audio Fidelity. It was re-issued again on SACD by Dutton Vocalion in 2017 containing both the quadraphonic and stereo mixes.

With the addition of trombonist Ron Moss, this lineup toured and recorded the live album Live (1977) which was re-issued in 1978 as a 4-LP set called Return to Forever Live: The Complete Concert.

Track listing 
"The Musician" (Chick Corea) – 7:12
"Hello Again" (Stanley Clarke) – 3:49
"Musicmagic" (Corea, Gayle Moran) – 11:00
"So Long Mickey Mouse" (Clarke) – 6:09
"Do You Ever" (Moran) – 3:59
"The Endless Night" (Corea, Moran) – 9:41

Personnel 
 Chick Corea – acoustic piano, Fender Rhodes electric piano, Hohner clavinet, synthesizers (ARP Odyssey, Minimoog, Polymoog, Moog 15 modular), vocals
 Gayle Moran – acoustic piano, Hammond B3 organ, Polymoog, vocals
 Joe Farrell – piccolo flute, flute, soprano saxophone, tenor saxophone
 James Tinsley – piccolo trumpet, trumpet
 John Thomas – trumpet, flugelhorn
 James E. Pugh – tenor trombone
 Harold Garret – tenor trombone, bass trombone, baritone horn
 Stanley Clarke – electric bass, acoustic bass, vocals
 Gerry Brown – drums

Chart performance

References

External links 
 Return to Forever - Musicmagic (1977) album review by Jason Elias, credits & releases at AllMusic
 Return to Forever - Musicmagic (1977) album releases & credits at Discogs
 Return to Forever - Musicmagic (1977) album credits & user reviews at ProgArchives.com
 Return to Forever - Musicmagic (1977) album to be listened as stream on Spotify

1977 albums
Columbia Records albums
Return to Forever albums